Mikhaylovka is a rural locality (a selo) in Tretyakovsky Selsoviet, Tretyakovsky District, Altai Krai, Russia. The population was 531 as of 2013. There are 4 streets.

Geography 
Mikhaylovka is located 27 km south of Staroaleyskoye (the district's administrative centre) by road. Tretyakovo is the nearest rural locality.

References 

Rural localities in Tretyakovsky District